André Micael Pereira (born 4 February 1989), known as Micael, is a Portuguese professional footballer who plays as a central defender.

Club career
Born in Guimarães, Micael progressed through the ranks of local teams Moreirense F.C. and Vitória S.C. before making his senior debut with the former in the third division in September 2008. He was a regular as they won promotion to the Segunda Liga in the 2009–10 season. In January 2011, he transferred to Primeira Liga club S.C. Olhanense to replace Jardel, who had been sold to S.L. Benfica.

In 2013, Micael signed for Zawisza Bydgoszcz of Poland's Ekstraklasa. In his first season, he and compatriots Alvarinho and Bernardo Vasconcelos won the Polish Cup on penalties against Zagłębie Lubin, and months later under Portuguese manager Jorge Paixão and with Joshua Silva besides him in defence, the team beat Legia Warsaw 3–2 in the Polish SuperCup.

Micael returned to Moreirense, now in the top flight, on a three-year contract on 11 June 2015. On 29 January 2017, he played in their 1–0 victory over S.C. Braga in the Taça da Liga final at the Estádio Algarve, their first major honour.

After a year abroad with Saudi Arabian club Al-Faisaly FC and CS Gaz Metan Mediaș of Romania's Liga I, Micael signed a one-year deal at newly promoted F.C. Paços de Ferreira on 8 July 2019. On his debut on 3 August he scored in a 1–1 home draw with G.D. Estoril Praia in the second round of the league cup (advancing on penalties). In his second league fixture on 20 September, he was sent off in a 2–1 defeat of C.D. Aves that was the first victory of the campaign for the side.

Rarely used in his year at Paços, Micael dropped down a league and joined Varzim S.C. on 31 July 2020.

Honours
Moreirense
Taça da Liga: 2016–17
Segunda Divisão: 2009–10

Zawisza Bydgoszcz
Polish Cup: 2013–14
Polish SuperCup: 2014

References

External links

1989 births
Living people
Sportspeople from Guimarães
Portuguese footballers
Association football defenders
Primeira Liga players
Liga Portugal 2 players
Segunda Divisão players
Moreirense F.C. players
S.C. Olhanense players
F.C. Paços de Ferreira players
Varzim S.C. players
Ekstraklasa players
Zawisza Bydgoszcz players
Al-Faisaly FC players
Liga I players
CS Gaz Metan Mediaș players
Portuguese expatriate footballers
Expatriate footballers in Poland
Expatriate footballers in Saudi Arabia
Expatriate footballers in Romania
Portuguese expatriate sportspeople in Poland
Portuguese expatriate sportspeople in Saudi Arabia
Portuguese expatriate sportspeople in Romania